Adisu Tebebu (born 3 December 1980) is an Ethiopian boxer. He competed in the men's lightweight event at the 2000 Summer Olympics.

References

1980 births
Living people
Ethiopian male boxers
Olympic boxers of Ethiopia
Boxers at the 2000 Summer Olympics
Place of birth missing (living people)
Lightweight boxers